Karunaige Agu is a 1990 Maldivian film directed by Easa Shareef. Produced by Shareef under D.H. Studio and Easa Films, the film stars Asad Shareef, Fathimath Nizar, Fathimath Rahma and Easa Shareef in pivotal roles.

Premise
Shahid Shareef (Asad Shareef), an intelligent doctor proposes his colleague, a hardworking nurse, Shiyana (Fathimath Rahma) who accepts him as her love interest despite being hesitant due to their social difference. Meanwhile, his impertinent mother, Shahidha (Fathimath Didi) arranges his marriage with a prideful daughter from a wealthy family, Shehenaz (Fathimath Nizar), whose father, also the step-father of Shahid, financed him with medical education. He gets heartbroken when he hear the news of his marriage being arranged to Shehenaz, though hopeless, he agrees to the wedding. The couples experience infertility and Shahid suggest that his plan for another marriage if his wife cannot conceive a baby for him. Shortly, Shehenaz discovers her husband's affair with Shiyana.

Shahid's father, Muneer (Kaneeru Abdul Raheem), agrees him to marry Shiyana and this initiates a series of hurdles in the family. After the demise of Muneer and Shahidha, Shehenaz dominates in the house and undermines Shiyana at all her attempts. Soon after Shiyana gives birth to a healthy boy, Shahid has to leave abroad for a course. In the meantime, Shehenaz's friend, Ziyad (Easa Shareef) stays in their house. Shehenaz takes the opportunity to plant evidence against her as having an affair with Ziyad. Shiyana, nothing in her defense and none to protect her, is thrown out from Shahid's house.

Cast 
 Asad Shareef as Shahid Shareef
 Fathimath Nizar as Shehenaz
 Fathimath Rahma as Shiyana
 Easa Shareef as Ziyad
 Fathimath Didi as Shahidha
 Kaneeru Abdul Raheem as Muneer; Shehenaz's father
 Aishath as Shaaira
 Ahusan
 Sithi Fulhu as Shiyana's grandmother
 Jaleel as Wahid

Soundtrack

Response
The film received mixed reviews from critics, where the performance of the lead actors and the songs by Abdul Hannan Moosa Didi were in particular praised by the critics.

References

Maldivian drama films
1990 films
1990 drama films
Dhivehi-language films